HMS Odin (N84) was an O-class submarine of the Royal Navy. She was laid down by HM Dockyard at Chatham in Kent on 23 June 1927, launched on 5 May 1928 and commissioned on 21 December 1929.  The name Odin refers to the 74-gun, Danish man-of-war surrendered to the British in 1807.

She served with the 5th Flotilla at Portsmouth in 1929–1930, with the 4th Flotilla at Hong Kong from 1930–1939, with the 8th Flotilla at Colombo in Ceylon in 1939–1940, and with the 1st Flotilla at Alexandria in Egypt in 1940.

References

Odin-class submarines of the Royal Navy
Ships built in Chatham
1928 ships
World War II submarines of the United Kingdom
Lost submarines of the United Kingdom
World War II shipwrecks in the Mediterranean Sea
Maritime incidents in June 1940
Submarines sunk by Italian warships